Theodore Garmon "Wes" Westmoreland, II is a printer, entrepreneur, businessman and former state senator. Westmoreland was appointed to the North Carolina Senate by Governor Beverly Perdue to fill the unexpired term of North Carolina Senator Debbie Clary in 2012. He is the second great grandson of John Franklin Westmoreland, also a printer, who also served in the North Carolina Senate 26th District from 1895 through 1896. Westmoreland is the founder and president of Westmoreland Printers, Inc. based in Shelby, North Carolina. He is a founding board member of Pinnacle Classical Academy, a college preparatory charter school in Cleveland County.

Career
Westmoreland completed his undergraduate degree at Gardner-Webb University in 1988. He is a fifth-generation printer and founded Westmoreland Printers, Inc. in 1999. Westmoreland was named Entrepreneur of the Year by the Cleveland County Chamber of Commerce in 2004.

Political career

North Carolina Senate
In 2006, Westmoreland ran for the 46th Senate District seat against incumbent Senator Walter Dalton. In 2012, Westmoreland was appointed to the North Carolina Senate by Governor Bev Perdue to serve the remainder of North Carolina Senator Debbie Clary’s two-year term for the 46th Senate District, at that time comprised Cleveland and Rutherford counties.

Legislative service
In January 2012, Westmoreland was appointed to six standing committees including Agriculture/Environment/Natural Resources, Appropriations on Natural and Economic Resources, Commerce, Finance, Judiciary II and Program Evaluation. During the short session of 2012, Westmoreland was the primary sponsor of two bills passed into law, SB 805 and SB 951. As a member of the Program Evaluation Committee, Westmoreland added a study to review the process of opening charter schools in North Carolina.

Other activities
Westmoreland is a founding board member of Pinnacle Classical Academy, a college preparatory charter school in Cleveland County, serving as board chair from 2014-2017. In 2013, Westmoreland was appointed to the Rural Infrastructure Authority for the North Carolina Department of Commerce, and elected Vice-Chairman in August 2017. He also served on the board of the directors of the Printing Industries of the Carolinas from 2013-2017, a trustee for Cleveland Community College serving as chair for the 2017-18 academic year, and on the Executive Board of the North Carolina Association of Community College Trustees.

Previously, Westmoreland served on the Board of Directors of Cleveland County Communities in Schools and the Commercial Graphics Advisory Committee of Spartanburg Technical College. He also served as President of the Gardner-Webb University Alumni Association and was a Trustee for Gardner-Webb from 2006 through 2009.

References

Republican Party North Carolina state senators
1964 births
Living people